Alan Huerta (born September 11, 1995) is an American professional footballer who plays as a midfielder for Atlante of Ascenso MX.

Career
Huerta first appeared in the Copa MX on August 19, 2014, against Toluca, although he appeared on the bench twenty days earlier against Pumas UNAM. As of October 26, 2017, he has never professional scored a goal.

Career Statistics

References

Liga MX players
Living people
American soccer players
1995 births
Soccer players from California
Association football midfielders
Atlante F.C. footballers